Chimbas is a department of the province of San Juan, Argentina. It is located on the south bank of the San Juan River, and is part of greater San Juan. The department is thoroughly urbanized and industrial.

Origin of name 
This name comes from the Basque language, and translates as "field outside the river" or "opposite side of the river."

Departments of San Juan Province, Argentina